Opeyemi Gbenga Kayode (born 16 April 1988), known by his stage name Pepenazi, is a Nigerian singer and songwriter.

Early life and education 
Pepenazi was born in Lagos and grew up listening to Ebenezer Obey, King Sunny Adé, The Beattles, I. K. Dairo and Fela Kuti. He received his primary education at Kemeesther Nursery and Primary School in Aguda Surulere, Lagos. Pepenazi had his secondary-school education at Mayflower School in Ikenne, Ogun State, where his growing interest for rap emerged as he listened to Wyclef Jean, the Notorious B.I.G, P. Diddy, Fat Joe and others. He bagged a Bachelor of Technology degree in Estate Management from the Federal University of Technology, Akure, Ondo State, where he recorded his first single. Pepenazi won a student election to become the Student Union's Director of Socials and participated in an album, Futa's Finnest.

Career

2012–2014 
Pepenazi entered the Nigerian music industry in 2012, when he released a rap single entitled "Arose". Produced by Bam Tunes, it was followed by a video. As a final-year student, however, Pepenazi took a break from the entertainment scene and entered the National Youth Service Corps; he won the 2013 Airtel NYSC Lagos Camp Freestyle Competition. He appeared on two Olamide albums: Baddest Guy Ever Liveth (on "Motivation", with Ice Prince and Endia)  and Street OT (on "Usain Bolt P", with Lil Kesh and Chinko Ekun). He released two singles ("Born You" and "Low") in October 2014, which received some airplay.

2015–2016 
He released "Adam", a hardcore rap single with Olamide, on 8 February 2015. On 22 May of that year, Pepenazi released the alternative single "Fifemayo" followed by a music video a week later. His "Low" video included Iyanya, Sound Sultan, Lil Kesh, Samklef, DJ Spinall and Viktoh in cameo appearances.

 Pepenazi then featured Olamide on "Illegal"-a pop single which became his major hit. Although Pepenazi's featuring of Olamide triggered speculations that he was signed to YBNL Nation (Olamide's label), he said in a Green News interview that his label (Ecleftic Entertainment) was only affiliated with YBNL Nation. "Illegal" was ranked as a top-five dance-stimulating Nigerian song.

According to Jim Donnett of tooxclusive.com, Pepenazi was a performer to watch.

He performed at the Ibadan edition of Star Trek on 30 August 2015, and was nominated for Rookie of the Year during the 2015 Headies Awards.

Pepenazi was nominated and won the Most Promising Artist of the Year award at the 2015 Scream Awards, and Revelation/Industry's Cynosure of the year at the 2015 MoreKlue All Youths Awards (MAYA). He released "One For The Road" (produced by Pheelz) in 2016, followed by a video and the dance-hall single "Iwo Na (Your Wishes)" with YBNL Nation's Lil Kesh.

In addition to his solo work, Pepenazi was featured on "Gone are the Days" (with DJ Exclusive and Olamide), "Obi Remix" (with Skales and Reminisce), "Motivation" (with Olamide, Ice Prince and Endia), "In Da Mix" (with DJ Snoop), "Dishanku" (with Slay Velli), "Shut Down" (with DJ CLASSIC) "Eran" (with Pjay and Indomix), "Usain Bolt P" (with Olamide, Lil Kesh and Chinko Ekun) and "Designer Remix" (with Tipsy Araga, Xino and Chinko Ekun). He has worked with a number of producers, including Pheelz, Dapiano, Young John, T Mode, Drey Beatz, Oga Jojo and Htee.

2017 
Pepenazi traveled to South Africa and performed at the Harem and Moloko clubs. He then released videos for "I Ain't Gat No Time (Male Remix)" (featuring Reminisce and Falz) and the song's female remix, featuring Lucy Q, Phlow and Mz Kiss. Pepenazi released "Ase", featuring Tiwa Savage and Masterkraft, on 15 May. This was followed by a video and the launch of his website on 5 June. Pepenazi released another dance-hall single, "Jabo", on 2 August.

Notable performances 
He appeared at the 2014 and 2015 editions of Copa Lagos. In 2015, Pepenazi performed at the 2015 Star Trek grand finale in Lagos. He appeared in season two of Olamide Live in Concert (OLIC 2), and performed at the December 2015 One Lagos Fiesta.

Discography

Awards

References

External links 
Website

1988 births
Living people
21st-century Nigerian male singers
English-language singers from Nigeria
Mayflower School alumni
Musicians from Lagos
Nigerian hip hop singers
Nigerian male singer-songwriters
Yoruba-language singers